is a Japanese sports shooter. She competed in the women's 25 metre pistol event at the 1984 Summer Olympics.

References

1955 births
Living people
Japanese female sport shooters
Olympic shooters of Japan
Shooters at the 1984 Summer Olympics
Place of birth missing (living people)